Keir Hardie Brennan-Simmons (born 22 February 1972) is an English journalist. He has been the senior international correspondent for the NBC morning show Today since December 2018. He also appears regularly on the evening broadcast NBC Nightly News, and fills in as an anchor on MSNBC.

From August 2012 until December 2018, Simmons was a foreign correspondent for NBC News. Previously, he was the UK editor for ITN's ITV News.

Early life and education
Simmons was born in London, England and grew up in Bristol. He was educated at Wellsway School, a state comprehensive school in the town of Keynsham in Somerset and St Brendans College, a state Catholic school, followed by Goldsmiths College, a constituent college of the University of London, where he earned a bachelor's degree. His sister is actress and health campaigner Mika Simmons.

Career
Simmons's first job in journalism was as a court reporter covering murders and scandals in London at the Old Bailey. Simmons then moved into radio, joining ITN as a reporter for UK's Independent Radio News (IRN) in 1996, before becoming a general reporter on its ITV News service in 1998.

While at ITV, Simmons reported on major domestic and international stories including the 2004 Indian Ocean earthquake and tsunami, the 2008 Mumbai attacks, the poisoning of Alexander Litvinenko and the Virginia Tech shooting. He was one of the first journalists to cover the 2007 disappearance of Madeleine McCann.

In 2010, Simmons was the first to report that the UK government was paying millions of pounds in compensation to former prisoners of the Guantanamo Bay detention camp.

On 30 September 2010 ITV News announced that Simmons would be appointed as the new UK Editor.

In 2011, Simmons led ITV's coverage of the News International phone hacking scandal, breaking stories which included news of the arrest of key figures and the resignation of the Metropolitan Police Commissioner, Sir Paul Stephenson

While working as a reporter for ITV News, Simmons occasionally made on-air appearances on Sky News, 5 News, and ITV London's London Tonight. In September and October 2011, he guest presented on ITV Breakfast program Daybreak.

On 27 August 2012 Simmons left ITN to join NBC News as a London-based foreign correspondent. He reported for all platforms of NBC News, including Today, Nightly News, MSNBC, and NBCNews.com.

NBC News (2012 - present) 
In December 2018, Simmons was named Senior International Correspondent for The Today Show on NBC News. He appears regularly on NBC Nightly News and as a fill-in anchor on MSNBC.

Keir Simmons interviewed Vladimir Putin in person in Moscow on June 11, 2021.

Keir Simmons interviewed the Japanese Prime Minister in person in Tokyo in July, 2021.

Keir Simmons reported on the death of Queen Elizabeth on September 8, 2022, standing in the rain outside of Buckingham Palace.

On 28 February, 2023 NBC published a report by Simmons from Sevastopol, Crimea. Simmons said he travelled to Crimea by train from Moscow on the Kerch Bridge. Visiting Crimea from Russia is illegal under Ukrainian law and Ukrainian authorities said they were investigating the circumstances of the illegal visit. In response to the visit, Simmons was added to the Myrotvorets list of 'Enemies of Ukraine'.

Awards 
In 2003, he was nominated for a Royal Television Society Award.

In July 2016 he was nominated for an Emmy Award in the category 'Outstanding Coverage of a Breaking News Story in a News Magazine' for his contribution to a Dateline NBC special 'Terror in Paris'.

In July 2017 he was nominated for an Emmy Award in the category 'Outstanding Coverage of a Breaking News Story in a News Magazine' for his contribution to a TODAY Show special 'Terror in Brussels'.

References

External links

1972 births
20th-century English non-fiction writers
21st-century English writers
5 News presenters and reporters
Alumni of Goldsmiths, University of London
English editors
English television journalists
Financial Times people
ITN newsreaders and journalists
ITV Breakfast presenters and reporters
Living people
NBC News people
News editors
British newspaper journalists
Journalists from Bristol
Sky News newsreaders and journalists
English television editors
Television personalities from London
Writers from London